Clube Atlético Assisense, or simply Assisense, is a Brazilian football team based in Assis, São Paulo. Founded in 1995, it plays in Campeonato Paulista Segunda Divisão.

History
The club was founded on March 27, 1995, as an amateur team by the fathers of the youngsters playing in the Escolinha de Futebol Peraltinha youth academy. As the youth academy had a partnership with Cruzeiro Esporte Clube, they adopted the same colors as the Minas Gerais-based club and Assis municipality flag. Assisense then adopted the same colors as Cruzeiro and the youth academy. The club professionalized its football department in 2003, competing in the same year in the Campeonato Paulista Série B3.

Stadium
Clube Atlético Assisense play their home games at Estádio Municipal Antônio Viana da Silva, nicknamed Tonicão. The stadium has a maximum capacity of 10,100 people.

References

Association football clubs established in 1995
Football clubs in São Paulo (state)
1995 establishments in Brazil